Cleopatra: Riddle of the Tomb is a 2007 adventure video game by French developer Kheops Studio. Outside of the United States, it is known as Cleopatra: A Queen's Destiny.

Plot 
Taking place in 48 BCE, the plot of the game centres on Cleopatra's struggle toward the Egyptian throne, and her subsequent battle with her brother Ptolemy.

Gameplay 
Like other adventure games of the time, Cleopatra has a Myst-like series of panoramic screens that the player can navigate through, allowing them to click on hotspots to: advance to new locations, acquire inventory, complete puzzles, or interact with characters. The game uses "dynamic combinatorial inventory", which allows players to disassemble certain items in their inventory; using only a piece of one to combine with other items.

Critical reception 
The game has a rating of 67% on Metacritic, based on 11 critical reviews.

Frank D. Nicodem, Jr. of UHS praised the game's historical accuracy, user interface, and puzzles, adding that the game exhibits all the qualities that made Kheops Studio a leader in historical video games, alongside Return to Mysterious Island, Voyage, Secret of the Lost Cavern, and Destination: Treasure Island. Meanwhile, Looney4Labs of Gameboomers thought that the game was highly entertaining. IGN reviewer Emily Balistrieri thought the game would be appealing to those interested in post-Alexander Ancient Egypt, as it involved puzzles that are naturally integrated into the context.

References

External links 
 Cleopatra: Riddle of the Tomb at MobyGames

2007 video games
Adventure games
MacOS games
Video games developed in France
Kheops_Studio_games
Video games set in Egypt
Windows games